Flight to Tangier is a 1953 American action film directed by Charles Marquis Warren and starring Joan Fontaine, Jack Palance, and Corinne Calvet. It was released by Paramount Pictures in Technicolor and 3-D.

This film also appeared in No Country for Old Men (2007) which like Flight to Tangier, it was currently owned by Paramount Pictures (via Miramax and Paramount Vantage).

Plot 
Aboard a private plane, pilot Hank Brady pulls a gun on his lone passenger, Franz Kovaz, after putting the instruments on automatic pilot. Waiting at Tangier airport is another American pilot, Gil Walker, his French girlfriend Nicki and her companion Danzer, a woman named Susan Lane, and a police lieutenant, Luzon.  The plane passes over the airport, then crashes and bursts into flame.

Captured by police while investigating the wreck, Gil and Susan are taken in to Luzon's superior, Col. Wier, for questioning. It is revealed that Gil had known Hank during the war and Susan had been engaged to him.

Suspicious characters follow them, led by Danzer, who forces his way into their car. It turns out Kovaz was carrying forged documents worth a great deal of money. Gil, Susan and Nicki are held by Danzer's men, but they are found by the police, led by Luzon, who is shot and killed.  Gil escapes.

Gil ends up on the run, suspected of murder, and not sure whom to trust. The plot thickens when both Hank and Kovaz turn up, having parachuted to safety from the plane. In a final confrontation, Hank and Susan are both revealed to be US government agents, working undercover. Hank is killed.  During a gunfight, most of the gang, and Nicki, are killed.  Gil is free to go, and he and Susan board the same plane to America.

Cast 
 Joan Fontaine as Susan Lane
 Jack Palance as Gil Walker
 Corinne Calvet as Nicki
 Robert Douglas as Danzer
 Marcel Dalio as Goro
 Jeff Morrow as Colonel C.M. Wier
 Richard Shannon as Lieutenant Bill Luzon
 Murray Matheson as Franz Kovaz
 John Doucette as Tirera
 John Pickard as Hank Brady
 James K Anderson as Dullah
 Peter Coe as Hanrah
 John Wengraf as Kalferez
 Bob Templeton as Luzon's Policeman

References

External links 
 

1950s action thriller films
American spy films
American action thriller films
Cold War spy films
Films directed by Charles Marquis Warren
Films set in Tangier
1953 3D films
Paramount Pictures films
Films shot in Los Angeles
1953 crime drama films
1953 films
Films scored by Paul Sawtell
American 3D films
1950s English-language films
1950s American films